Lord Maximus Farquaad is the main antagonist of the 2001 animated feature film Shrek, as well as Shrek 4-D and the musical. He is voiced by John Lithgow. He does not appear in William Steig's original picture book of the same name.

In the Shrek films

Shrek
Lord Farquaad is the short-in-stature, ruthless ruler of Duloc. Several times in the film it is observed that, with Duloc's towering height, Farquaad may be compensating for something. Farquaad's birthday is stated to be on April 15th.

In his pursuit of perfection, Farquaad attempts to rid his kingdom of Fairy Tale creatures, offering a bounty for their capture. But because Farquaad is not of royal blood, he cannot become a king until he marries a princess. He decides that Princess Fiona can be his perfect wife and queen, but she first must be rescued from her tower, which is guarded by a fire-breathing dragon.

Unwilling to perform the rescue himself, Farquaad holds a tournament to discover the knight who will rescue Fiona. Shrek and Donkey arrive at Duloc during the tournament attempting to force Farquaad to remove the Fairy Tale creatures from his swamp. They defeat the knights, so Farquaad decides to send Shrek on the quest. Farquaad agrees to move the Fairy Tale creatures out of Shrek's swamp and grant him the deed to the swamp to prevent any future squatters if Shrek rescues Fiona. Shrek delivers Fiona to Farquaad, who immediately proposes, unaware that she becomes an ogress at sunset. Shrek later disrupts the marriage ceremony, delaying a kiss between Farquaad and Fiona until after sunset.

Fiona makes the transition from human to ogress form, upon which Farquaad rejects his new bride, proclaiming that he will banish her back to the tower she came from and claiming the title of King, while also sentencing Shrek to death. Before Farquaad finishes his claim of becoming the new King, the dragon who had guarded Fiona, and who developed an infatuation for Donkey while Fiona was being rescued, crashes through the window in response to Shrek's beckoning whistle. She devours Farquaad with little effort, belching out his crown. Farquaad was apparently not well-liked in Duloc, as when he is eaten, the citizens laugh and cheer for his demise.

Farquaad returns as a ghost in the Shrek 4-D theater attraction at Universal Parks (which later aired on Nickelodeon), in which he attempts to murder Shrek and Donkey and kidnap and kill Fiona so she can be his ghost queen. Fiona is rescued when Farquaad is destroyed by the Dragon again.

Alan Rickman was originally offered the role, but he turned it down to play Severus Snape in the Harry Potter film saga instead.

Shrek the Third
Lord Farquaad makes an appearance in Shrek the Third (2007), during Gingy the Gingerbread Man's flashbacks, in which Farquaad yanks off Gingy's legs and mocks Gingy with them. This is a reference to the first Shrek film.

Shrek Forever After
He was originally intended to appear in the alternate universe (in which he would still be alive due to Dragon still being evil and not eating him), but the decision was apparently dropped.

Lord Farquaad also makes a cameo in reused footage from the first film seen during the ending credits of Shrek Forever After (2010).

Scared Shrekless
Despite being eaten by Dragon in the first film, Lord Farquaad plays a fairly major role in the made-for-TV Halloween special Scared Shrekless. Shrek challenges his friends to spend Halloween night in Farquaad's haunted castle, Duloc. The three little pigs note that Duloc was where Farquaad lived and died. Later, Shrek mentions how Donkey played a role in Farquaad's death.

In other media
Outside of the film series, Farquaad appears in the Universal Studios Theme Parks ride Shrek 4-D and its comic book adaptation by Dark Horse Comics. In the series, Farquaad returns as a ghost, with plans to make Fiona his Queen of the Underworld so that he will be King of the Underworld. However, he is once again defeated, only to reappear in the second issue; this time, he orders a man named Ferret and his hitman Vesuvius to kill Shrek, who at the moment is investigating a foul-smelling gingerbread house. Farquaad's appearance here is comparatively minor.

He does not appear in the third and final issue, save for a brief mention. Farquaad again appeared as an evil spirit in the Game Boy Advance game Shrek: Reekin' Havoc, in which he made evil copies of fairy tale characters such as Pinocchio, the Big Bad Wolf, Peter Pan, and a giant from the world of Jack and the Beanstalk. After these bosses are defeated, he kidnaps Shrek before the final face-off. He also makes a cameo in Shrek Smash n' Crash as a ghost. He also appears in the iPhone game "Shrek Kart" as a playable character called "Ghost of Lord Farquaad".

Because of an uncanny resemblance to Lord Farquaad, Leicester City FC defender Çağlar Söyüncü was given that nickname on his arrival at the club.

In theatre
In the original Broadway production of Shrek The Musical, the role was played by Tony Award nominee Christopher Sieber. Since Sieber is approximately 6'2" (1.88 m), he played the role on his knees, to give the illusion that he is really 4'2" (1.27 m). He did, however, walk and finally stand for the curtain call. He earned his second Tony nomination for this part.

Though the film and musical are similar in many ways, Farquaad in the musical is more flamboyant and fun-loving, less subtle, and even more conceited. While practicing what he will say when he meets Fiona for the first time, he considers saying to call him "Maximus", presumably his first name.

Instead of holding a tournament, a raffle drawing is held to pick the knight to rescue Fiona with an extravagant song and dance number starring Farquaad and the Duloc Dancers called "What's Up Duloc". In one Broadway parody moment in the show, he ascends a tower at the end and imitates the end of Defying Gravity from the musical Wicked.

In the second act, he is seen playing a lampoon of Space Invaders on the Magic Mirror while taking a bubble bath. His past (which was never brought up in the movie) and the reason for his hatred for "that fairy tale trash" is elaborated on in his other song, "The Ballad of Farquaad". It turns out his father was one of Snow White's dwarfs, and his mother was the princess from "The Princess and the Pea", who left her crown behind so she could marry him. Unfortunately, she was so sensitive that she had to sleep on 25 mattresses and "one night she rolled over...and Mama was gone".

Farquaad claims that his father abandoned him in the woods as a child (similar to Shrek and Fiona's tales of being sent away by their own parents as children in the musical); however, when the fairy tale creatures crash his wedding to protest their banishment and bring along his father, it is revealed that he was kicked out because "you were 28 and living in my basement". After his humiliation, Fiona is transformed and the show continues in the same manner as the movie, with Farquaad proclaiming himself king and subsequently being killed by the Dragon (except that, in this version, Dragon kills him with her fire breath instead of eating him).

Sieber played the role for the duration of the Broadway run. The show then embarked on a First National Tour, in which Todd Buonopane was cast as Farquaad. However, he was replaced by David F.M. Vaughn in previews, the night before the tour opened. Nigel Harman played the role in London's West End beginning in May 2011.

Inspiration
There is speculation that Lord Farquaad's appearance was inspired by Michael Eisner, the then–CEO of The Walt Disney Company, because of producer Jeffrey Katzenberg's animosity toward his former employer. Some sources have likened King Richard III of England with Lord Farquaad.

Other speculations include that his appearance is based on a conglomeration of perfectionists and megalomaniacs, such as Napoleon, Joseph Stalin, Hideki Tojo and even Adolf Hitler. There is a claim that Lord Farquaad was named after film animator Mark Farquhar.

References

Shrek characters
Male characters in animated films
Film characters introduced in 2001
Characters created by Ted Elliott and Terry Rossio
Fictional characters with dwarfism
Fictional lords and ladies
Fictional dictators
Fictional ghosts
Animated human characters
Male film villains
Universal Pictures cartoons and characters
Animated characters introduced in 2001